Charles Timothy Shaffer (October 2, 1945 – May 3, 2022) was an American judge and politician from Pennsylvania who served as a Republican member of the Pennsylvania State Senate for the 21st district from 1981 to 1996.

Shaffer served as a lieutenant in the U.S. Army during the Vietnam War.

In May 2010, Shaffer was nominated by Governor Ed Rendell to serve as a judge for the Butler County Magisterial District.  He was confirmed by the Pennsylvania Senate and served until his retirement in December 2015.

He died at his farm home built in 1830 on May 3, 2022, at the age of 76.

Legacy
In 2018, Butler County Community College created The Shaffer School of Nursing and Allied Health after Shaffer donated $1 million to the school.

He was also a vital part in the founding of the Prospect Area Preservation Society which now houses many artifacts from his life that he personally donated through his time with the organization.

References

1945 births
2022 deaths
20th-century American politicians
Military personnel from Pennsylvania
Pennsylvania district justices
Pennsylvania lawyers
Republican Party Pennsylvania state senators
People from Butler, Pennsylvania